Karestan Chase Koenen (born June 23, 1968) is an American epidemiologist and Professor of Psychiatric Epidemiology at the Harvard T.H. Chan School of Public Health. She is also the head of the Global Neuropsychiatric Genomics Initiative of the Stanley Center for Psychiatric Research at the Broad Institute. She is a fellow of the American Psychopathological Association and a former president of the International Society for Traumatic Stress Studies. In 2015, she received the Robert S. Laufer, PhD, Memorial Award for Outstanding Scientific Achievement from the International Society for Traumatic Stress Studies.

Publications
Treating Survivors of Childhood Abuse and Interpersonal Trauma, the revised and updated version she co-authored, was published in June 2020

Education

Post-doctoral Fellowship, 2002, Psychiatric Epidemiology, Columbia University
Ph.D., 1999, Clinical Psychology, Boston University
M.A., 1996, Developmental Psychology, Columbia University
B.A., 1990, Economics, Wellesley College

References

External links
Faculty page

Living people
1968 births
American women psychiatrists
American women epidemiologists
American epidemiologists
Wellesley College alumni
Columbia University alumni
Boston University alumni
Harvard School of Public Health faculty
Broad Institute people
American women academics
21st-century American women